The Bensbach River is a river in southwestern Papua New Guinea. It is located just to the east of the Maro River in Merauke Regency, Indonesia, and just to the west of the Morehead River in Papua New Guinea.

The mouth of the river, Torasi Estuary, marks part of the extreme southern boundary between Papua New Guinea and Indonesia. 

The river is strongly meandering and rather narrow. From the rivermouth, it stretches in a roughly northeasterly direction, and so is entirely located in PNG territory. It flows through the Trans-Fly savanna and grasslands, including the Tonda Wildlife Management Area.

Europeans first discovered the river on 27 February 1893, and it was named after Jacob Bensbach, Dutch Resident at Ternate, by Sir William MacGregor. The local people call it the Torassi (sometimes spelled Torasi).

Tonda languages are spoken in the Bensbach River area.

See also
List of rivers of Papua New Guinea
Western Province (Papua New Guinea)
Tonda Wildlife Management Area
Trans-Fly savanna and grasslands
Morehead River

References

Rivers of Papua New Guinea